Coiled-coil domain-containing 184 (CCDC184) is a protein which, in humans, is encoded by the CCDC184 gene

Gene 

Alias for the CCDC184 gene is C12orf68, chromosome 12 open reading frame 68. CCDC184 mRNA sequence, which is 2283 nucleotides in length, and is composed of 1 exon.

Expression 

Human CCDC184 is primarily expressed in the components of the  brain, such as hypothalamus, pons, pituitary gland. The gene's expression  is enhanced and/or over-expressed in the brain tissue expression. Tissue expression cluster predicted Pituitary gland - Hormone signaling

Protein

Overview 
CCDC184 Protein is 194 amino acid and contains a domain of unknown function, DUF4677, which spans for 193 amino acid long . CCDC184 protein has a theoretical molecular weight of 20,484  dalton and an isoelectric point of 4.04. This indicates the acidic nature of the sequence. The molecular function of the protein is protein binding

Post translational Modification 

CCDC184 contains various predicted post-translational modification domains, including phosphorylation, SUMOylation, Glutaredoxin, Myristoylation, Glutamic acid-rich region, and acetylation. The phosphosphorylation sites include S23, T24, and Y36.

 
 P = Phosphorylation site, Sumo: Sumo interacting regions, DUF4677: domain of unknown function

Structure 
The human CCDC184 protein is predicted to be localized in the cytoplasm

AlphaFold figure indicates 3D model of CCDC184. The colors indicate the charged regions of the structure

Conceptual translation 

The annotated elements shown in the conceptual translation for human CCDC184 protein is post-translational modifications, alpha helices, SUMOylation, Lysine acetylation, domain of unknown function.

Homology 

CCDC184 is found only in mammals. 183 organisms that have orthologs with the human gene CCDC184.

Table of Orthologs 

Orthologs for CCDC184 are only found in mammals. The most distantly related species to human CCDC184 with a date of divergence of 160 MYA is the opossum. The Tasmanian devil also has a date of divergence of 160 MYA. The table indicates a various selection portion of the mammals' list.

 
The figure indicates a chart showing  the divergence of CCDC184, Cytochrome C and Fibrogen Alpha.

Interaction and clinical significance 
Predicted interactions for the CCDC184 gene were seen and the interactions revolved around enabling protein binding activity. Expressions of CCDC184 were connected to studies done on tissue samples for breast cancer somatic mutations

References